In  algebraic topology, homotopical connectivity is a property describing a topological space based on the dimension of its holes. In general, low homotopical connectivity indicates that the space has at least one low-dimensional hole. The concept of n-connectedness generalizes the concepts of path-connectedness and simple connectedness.

An equivalent definition of homotopical connectivity is based on the homotopy groups of the space. A space is n-connected  (or n-simple connected) if its first n homotopy groups are trivial.

Homotopical connectivity is defined for maps, too. A map is n-connected if it is an isomorphism "up to dimension n, in homotopy".

 Definition using holes 
All definitions below consider a topological space X.

A hole in X is, informally, a thing that prevents some suitably-placed sphere from continuously shrinking to a point. Equivalently, it is a sphere that cannot be continuously extended to a ball. Formally,

 A d-dimensional sphere in X is a continuous function .
 A d-dimensional ball in X is a continuous function .
 A d-dimensional-boundary hole in X is a d-dimensional sphere that is not nullhomotopic (- cannot be shrunk continuously to a point). Equivalently, it is a d-dimensional sphere that cannot be continuously extended to a (d+1)-dimensional ball. It is sometimes called a (d+1)-dimensional hole (d+1 is the dimension of the "missing ball").
 X is called n-connected if it contains no holes of boundary-dimension d ≤ n. 
 The homotopical connectivity of X, denoted , is the largest integer n for which X is n-connected. 
 A slightly different definition of connectivity, which makes some computations simpler, is: the smallest integer d such that X contains a d-dimensional hole.

 Examples 

 A 2-dimensional hole (a hole with a 1-dimensional boundary) is a circle (S1) in X, that cannot be shrunk continuously to a point in X. An example is shown on the figure at the right. The yellow region is the topological space X; it is a pentagon with a triangle removed. The blue circle is a 1-dimensional sphere in X. It cannot be shrunk continuously to a point in X; therefore; X has a 2-dimensional hole. Another example is the punctured plane - the Euclidean plane with a single point removed, . To make a 2-dimensional hole in a 3-dimensional ball, make a tunnel through it. In general, a space contains a 1-dimensional-boundary hole if and only if it is not simply-connected. Hence, simply-connected is equivalent to 1-connected. X is 0-connected but not 1-connected, so  . The lowest dimension of a hole is 2, so  .
 A 3-dimensional hole (a hole with a 2-dimensional boundary) is shown on the figure at the right. Here, X is a cube (yellow) with a ball removed (white). The 2-dimensional sphere (blue) cannot be continuously shrunk to a single point. X is simply-connected but not 2-connected, so . The smallest dimension of a hole is 3, so .

 For a 1-dimensional hole (a hole with a 0-dimensional boundary) we need to consider  - the zero-dimensional sphere. What is a zero dimensional sphere? - For every integer d, the sphere  is the boundary of the (d+1)-dimensional ball . Therefore,  is the set of two disjoint points {0, 1}. A zero-dimensional sphere in X is just a set of two points in X. If there is such a set, that cannot be continuously shrunk to a single point in X (or continuously extended to a segment in X), this means that there is no path between the two points, that is, X is not path-connected; see the figure at the right. Hence, path-connected is equivalent to 0-connected. X is not 0-connected, so  . The lowest dimension of a hole is 1, so  .
 A 0-dimensional hole is a missing 0-dimensional ball. A 0-dimensional ball is a single point; its boundary  is an empty set. Therefore, the existence of a 0-dimensional hole is equivalent to the space being empty. Hence, non-empty is equivalent to (-1)-connected.
 A ball has no holes of any dimension. Therefore, its connectivity is infinite: .

 Homotopical connectivity of spheres 
In general, for every integer d,  (and ) The proof requires two directions:

 Proving that , that is,  cannot be continuously shrunk to a single point. This can be proved using the Borsuk–Ulam theorem.
 Proving that , that is, that is, every continuous map  for  can be continuously shrunk to a single point.

 Definition using groups 
A space X is called n-connected, for n ≥ 0, if it is non-empty, and all its homotopy groups of order d ≤ n are the trivial group:  where  denotes the i-th homotopy group and 0 denotes the trivial group. The two definitions are equivalent. The requirement for an n-connected space consists of requirements for all d ≤ n:

 The requirement for d=-1 means that X should be nonempty.
 The requirement for d=0 means that X should be path-connected.
 The requirement for any d ≥ 1 means that X contains no holes of boundary dimension d. That is, every d-dimensional sphere in X is homotopic to a constant map. Therefore, the d-th homotopy group of X is trivial. The opposite is also true: If X has a hole with a d-dimensional boundary, then there is a d-dimensional sphere that is not homotopic to a constant map, so the d-th homotopy group of X is not trivial. In short, X has a hole with a d-dimensional boundary, if-and-only-if .The homotopical connectivity of X is the largest integer n for which X is n-connected.

The requirements of being non-empty and path-connected can be interpreted as (−1)-connected and 0-connected, respectively, which is useful in defining 0-connected and 1-connected maps, as below. The 0th homotopy set can be defined as:

This is only a pointed set, not a group, unless X is itself a topological group; the distinguished point is the class of the trivial map, sending S0 to the base point of X. Using this set, a space is 0-connected if and only if the 0th homotopy set is the one-point set. The definition of homotopy groups and this homotopy set require that X be pointed (have a chosen base point), which cannot be done if X is empty.

A topological space X is path-connected if and only if its 0th homotopy group vanishes identically, as path-connectedness implies that any two points x1 and x2 in X can be connected with a continuous path which starts in x1 and ends in x2, which is equivalent to the assertion that every mapping from S0 (a discrete set of two points) to X can be deformed continuously to a constant map. With this definition, we can define X to be n-connected if and only if

Examples
 A space X is (−1)-connected if and only if it is non-empty.
 A space X is 0-connected if and only if it is non-empty and path-connected.
 A space is 1-connected if and only if it is simply connected.
 An n-sphere is (n − 1)-connected.

n-connected map
The corresponding relative notion to the absolute notion of an n-connected space is an n-connected map, which is defined as a map whose homotopy fiber Ff is an (n − 1)-connected space. In terms of homotopy groups, it means that a map  is n-connected if and only if:
  is a surjection.

The last condition is frequently confusing; it is because the vanishing of the (n − 1)-st homotopy group of the homotopy fiber Ff corresponds to a surjection on the nth homotopy groups, in the exact sequence:

If the group on the right  vanishes, then the map on the left is a surjection.

Low-dimensional examples:
 A connected map (0-connected map) is one that is onto path components (0th homotopy group); this corresponds to the homotopy fiber being non-empty.
 A simply connected map (1-connected map) is one that is an isomorphism on path components (0th homotopy group) and onto the fundamental group (1st homotopy group).

n-connectivity for spaces can in turn be defined in terms of n-connectivity of maps: a space X with basepoint x0 is an n-connected space if and only if the inclusion of the basepoint  is an n-connected map. The single point set is contractible, so all its homotopy groups vanish, and thus "isomorphism below n and onto at n" corresponds to the first n homotopy groups of X vanishing.

Interpretation
This is instructive for a subset:
an n-connected inclusion  is one such that, up to dimension n − 1, homotopies in the larger space X can be homotoped into homotopies in the subset A.

For example, for an inclusion map  to be 1-connected, it must be:
 onto 
 onto 
One-to-one on  means that if there is a path connecting two points  by passing through X, there is a path in A connecting them, while onto  means that in fact a path in X is homotopic to a path in A.

In other words, a function which is an isomorphism on  only implies that any elements of  that are homotopic in X are abstractly homotopic in A – the homotopy in A may be unrelated to the homotopy in X – while being n-connected (so also onto ) means that (up to dimension n − 1) homotopies in X can be pushed into homotopies in A.

This gives a more concrete explanation for the utility of the definition of n-connectedness: for example, a space where the inclusion of the k-skeleton is n-connected (for n > k) – such as the inclusion of a point in the n-sphere – has the property that any cells in dimensions between k and n do not affect the lower-dimensional homotopy types.

 Lower bounds 
Many topological proofs require lower bounds on the homotopical connectivity. There are several "recipes" for proving such lower bounds.

 Homology 
This is useful for computing homotopical connectivity, since the homological groups can be computed more easily.

Suppose first that X is simply-connected, that is, . Therefore:If X is not simply-connected, thenstill holds. When  this is trivial. When  (so X is path-connected but not simply-connected), one should prove that . 

The inequality may be strict: there are spaces in which  but .

By definition, the k-th homology group of a simplicial complex depends only on the simplices of dimension at most k+1 (see simplicial homology). Therefore, the above theorem implies that a simplicial complex K is k-connected if and only if its (k+1)-dimensional skeleton (the subset of K containing only simplices of dimension at most k+1) is k-connected.:

 Join 
Let K and L be non-empty cell complexes. Then:The identity is simpler with the eta notation:

As an example, let  a set of two disconnected points. There is a 1-dimensional hole between the points, so the eta is 1. The join  is a square, which is homeomorphic to a circle, so its eta is 2.

The general proof is based on a similar formula for the homological connectivity.

 Nerve 
Let K1,...,Kn be abstract simplicial complexes, and denote their union by K.

Denote the nerve complex of {K1, ... , Kn} (the abstract complex recording the intersection pattern of the Ki) by N.

If, for each nonempty , the intersection  is either empty or (k−|J|+1)-connected, then for every j ≤ k, the j-th homotopy group of N is isomorphic to the j-th homotopy group of K.

In particular, N is k-connected if-and-only-if K is k-connected.

 Homotopy principle 
In geometric topology, cases when the inclusion of a geometrically-defined space, such as the space of immersions  into a more general topological space, such as the space of all continuous maps between two associated spaces  are n''-connected are said to satisfy a homotopy principle or "h-principle". There are a number of powerful general techniques for proving h-principles.

See also
 Connected space
 Connective spectrum
 Path-connected
 Simply connected
 Charlieplexing

References 

General topology
Properties of topological spaces
Homotopy theory